The 1st Battalion of Massachusetts Volunteer Heavy Artillery was a unit that served in the Union Army during the American Civil War. It was organized from several unattached companies of heavy artillery already raised and mustered into a three-year service for the defenses of the Massachusetts coast.

History
Company A
The 1st Unattached Company was formed in February 1862 for the garrisoning of Fort Warren in Boston Harbor. They remained here until 24 December 1864, when ordered to Champlain, New York due to "trouble being feared on the Canadian border". They returned to Fort Warren on 13 May 1865, and were mustered out on 20 October. Captain Stephen Cabot of this company would become the major of the battalion.

Company B
The 2nd Unattached Company was organized in October and November 1862, joining the 1st in garrison duty at Fort Warren. In July 1863, when a draft riot broke out in Boston, they were sent to restore order. In August, they were stationed at the Fort at Clark's Point, New Bedford, and remained there until its mustering out on 29 June 1865.

Company C
The 4th Unattached, being mustered in on 22 April 1863, then became Company C when the battalion was formed that month. They were also stationed at Fort Warren during most of their term of service. During the Boston draft in July, the company was sent there to maintain order, except for a detachment that went to Concord, New Hampshire to assist in keeping order during the draft taking place there, and stayed until September. The company was mustered out on 20 October 1865.

Company D
The battalion being formed by the three mentioned unattached companies at the end of April 1863, they were later joined by the 5th Unattached Co. after it was mustered in on 6 June 1863 and became Company D.

The four previously unattached companies were three-year units, and two additional companies (Companies E + F) were subsequently raised in August 1864 for one-year terms. Except where mentioned previously, the companies were all stationed at forts in Boston Harbor, with detachments from them being sent to other military locations along the coast.

Three of the companies were mustered out in June 1865, while the rest of the battalion stayed in service until September and October.

Complement
The First Battalion consisted of 39 officers and 1272 enlisted men.

Losses
The 1st Massachusetts Heavy Artillery lost 9 officers and 232 men were killed or died of wounds. 2 officers and 241 men died of disease or accidents.

See also
 List of Massachusetts Civil War Units
 Massachusetts in the American Civil War

Notes

References

External links
 1st Battalion, Massachusetts Heavy Artillery at FamilySearch

Units and formations of the Union Army from Massachusetts
1862 establishments in Massachusetts
Artillery units and formations of the American Civil War
Military units and formations established in 1862
Military units and formations disestablished in 1865